Howard College is a public community college with its main campus in Big Spring, Texas. It also has branch campuses in San Angelo and Lamesa.

History 
Howard County Junior College was established in Big Spring in 1945. 148 students began lessons in September 1946, in the hospital wing of the former Big Spring Army Air Force Bombardier School (later Webb Air Force Base). Five years later the school moved to a  site in southeast Big Spring which came to include an administration-classroom-library building, a practical-arts building, a greenhouse, a music building, dormitories, and a 10,000-seat stadium. The Lamesa campus was established in 1972 and the first class in San Angelo was held the following year. The school's name changed to Howard College by 1974.

Campus 

The main campus occupies  in Big Spring, with another  near Stanton in Martin County for agricultural research, and a  rodeo facility east of town. There are branch campuses in San Angelo, Lamesa, and at the SouthWest College for the Deaf in Big Spring; the college also offers programs at the Big Spring Federal Correctional Institute and the Eden Detention Center.

Organization and administration 
The president is Cheryl Sparks.

As defined by the Texas Legislature, the official service area of Howard College is Howard, Dawson, Martin, Glasscock, Sterling, Coke, Tom Green, Concho, Irion, Schleicher, Sutton, Menard, and Kimble counties.

Academics 
The college has 4,623 students of which 33% are full-time. It offers 41 majors in 17 programs and is accredited by The Commission on Colleges of the Southern Association of Colleges and Schools to award associate degrees.

Athletics 

The college sports teams are nicknamed the Hawks. Howard College participates in Region 5 of the NJCAA, also known as the Western Junior College Athletic Conference, in the following sports: baseball, softball, rodeo, men's and women's basketball, and cheerleading. The basketball and baseball games are broadcast locally on KBYG AM 1400.
After winning in 1991, Howard won the Junior College (JUCO) World Series a second time, in 2009, with a season record of 63–1.

Notable people 
 Brandon Claussen, professional baseball player
 Tyler Collins, professional baseball player
 Joe Cooper, professional basketball player
 Jae Crowder, professional basketball player
 Jim Evans, professional football player
 Ed Fortune, former politician in the Florida House of Representatives
 Rob Gray, professional basketball player
 Tarik Phillip (born 1993), professional basketball player
Burch Smith, professional baseball player

References

External links
Official website

 
Buildings and structures in Dawson County, Texas
Buildings and structures in Howard County, Texas
Community colleges in Texas
Education in Coke County, Texas
Education in Concho County, Texas
Education in Dawson County, Texas
Education in Glasscock County, Texas
Education in Howard County, Texas
Education in Irion County, Texas
Education in Kimble County, Texas
Education in Martin County, Texas
Education in Menard County, Texas
Education in Schleicher County, Texas
Education in Sterling County, Texas
Education in Sutton County, Texas
Education in Tom Green County, Texas
Buildings and structures in San Angelo, Texas
Universities and colleges accredited by the Southern Association of Colleges and Schools
Education in San Angelo, Texas
NJCAA athletics
1945 establishments in Texas
Educational institutions established in 1945